Farrod Green (born June 10, 1997) is an American football tight end who is a free agent. He was signed by the Colts as an undrafted free agent in 2020 following his college football career with the Mississippi State Bulldogs.

Professional career
Green signed with the Indianapolis Colts as an undrafted free agent following the 2020 NFL Draft on April 29, 2020. He was waived during final roster cuts on September 5, 2020, and signed to the practice squad the next day. He was elevated to the active roster on September 19 for the team's week 2 game against the Minnesota Vikings, and reverted to the practice squad after the game. On January 10, 2021, Green signed a reserve/futures contract with the Colts.

On August 31, 2021, Green was waived by the Colts and re-signed to the practice squad the next day. He signed a reserve/future contract on January 10, 2022. He was waived on May 10, 2022.

References

External links
Indianapolis Colts bio

1997 births
Living people
People from Wesson, Mississippi
Players of American football from Mississippi
American football tight ends
Mississippi State Bulldogs football players
Indianapolis Colts players